Viriliter age is a Latin phrase often used as a motto; lit. Act Manfully, but often given the new age translation Act Courageously. The origins of the phrase and the context for its use are from Psalm 27. It is or has been the official motto of the following institutions:

Cardinal Newman College Alumni Association, Buenos Aires, Argentina
Christian Brothers College, Bulawayo, Zimbabwe
Christian Brothers' College, Mount Edmund, Pretoria, South Africa
Damien Memorial School, Honolulu, Hawaii
Kilgraston School, Bridge of Earn, Scotland
Marist College Ashgrove adopted the motto in 1957
PAREF Southridge School, Muntinlupa, Metro Manila, Philippines
Presentation Brothers College, Cork
St Chad's College, Wolverhampton
St Columbas High School, Athlone, Cape Town, South Africa
St. Edward's College (former motto)
St. John The Baptist High School Thane, Maharashtra, India
St Joseph's College, Kolkata, India
St. Mary's Anglo-Indian Higher Secondary School, Armenian Street, Chennai (Madras), India.
St. Muredach's College, Ballina, Co. Mayo. Rep. of Ireland
St-Paul College, Godinne, Belgium 
St. Paul's RC High School, Coleshill, United Kingdom (Closed 1971)
Synge Street CBS, Dublin, Ireland
The Sacred Heart School of Montreal, Quebec, Canada
Trinity College, Perth, Western Australia
Trinity Grammar School, Kew, Melbourne, Australia
St. Sebastian's College, Moratuwa, Moratuwa, Sri Lanka
Cantwell High School, Montebello, California. (Cantwell-Sacred Heart of Mary since 1991).

References

Latin mottos
Latin words and phrases